Sawali Vihir Khurd is a village in Rahata taluka of Ahmednagar district in the state of Maharashtra of India.

Location
Sawali Vihir Kh. situated on north border of Rahata taluka and share border with Sawali Vihir Bk, Chande Kasare and Jeur Kumbhari villages.

Demographics
Population of Sawali Vihir Kh. is 3757. Males are 1920 whereas females are 1837.

See also
List of villages in Rahata taluka

References 

Villages in Ahmednagar district